Rajwar may refer to:

 Rajwar, a Raji-Raute language
 Sunita Rajwar (born 1969), Indian actress
 Rajuar, a Scheduled Tribe of Odisha and caste of other states
 Rajbhar, a community of northwest India
 Musahar, a Dalit community of Gangetic plain

See also
 Rajwara